Obia or OBIA may refer to:
 Obia, a Neotropical genus of planthoppers
 Obia (folklore), also spelt obeah, a monster in West African folklore
 Obeah, an indigenous group of African storytellers that survive in the West Indies
 Object-Based Image Analysis